The Happy Thieves is a 1961 American crime/comedy-drama film starring Rex Harrison and Rita Hayworth, and directed by George Marshall. The film is based on the novel The Oldest Confession by Richard Condon. The film was poorly received, with star Harrison later describing it as "absolute rubbish".

Plot
A valuable painting belonging to Duchess Blanca (Alida Valli) is stolen at night from her castle in Spain by one of her houseguests, Jimmy Bourne (Rex Harrison), who replaces the original work with a duplicate. The debonair gentleman thief then passes the painting to his partner in crime, Eve Lewis (Rita Hayworth). However, the artwork is subsequently stolen from them by a man acting on behalf of Dr. Victor Muñoz (Grégoire Aslan), the cousin of the duchess.

Eve wants to go straight, but Victor blackmails her and Jim, demanding that they steal a renowned painting (The Second of May 1808) by Francisco de Goya from the Prado Museum in Madrid. An exact copy of the painting is created by artist Jean Marie Calbert (Joseph Wiseman), and a switch is planned to take place during the farewell bullfight of a famous matador, Cayetano (Virgilio Teixeira), whom the duchess intends to wed.

During the bullfight, Victor secretly shoots Cayetano in order to create a diversion that will assist the art theft. News of the matador's death spreads quickly across the city and distracts the guards at the Prado Museum, allowing Jim and Jean to begin switching the two large paintings. Jean suddenly leaves the room before they are finished, but Eve arrives in time to help Jim complete the switch before the guards return.

Later, Jean turns up and goes with Jim to the house of Victor, where they find him dead. They are then framed for this murder by the duchess, who had killed Victor to avenge the death of Cayetano. Using the stolen Goya painting as a bargaining chip, Jim negotiates with the authorities, and he secures freedom for Jean and a reduced prison sentence for himself. Eve vows to wait for him.

Cast
 Rita Hayworth as Eve Lewis
 Rex Harrison as Jimmy Bourne
 Joseph Wiseman as Jean Marie Calbert
 Alida Valli as Duchess Blanca
 Grégoire Aslan as Dr. Victor Muñoz
 Virgilio Teixeira as Cayetano the Bullfighter (credited as Virgilio Texera)
 Peter Illing as Mr. Pickett
 Britta Ekman as Mrs. Pickett
 George Rigaud as Spanish Police Inspector
 Gérard Tichy as Antonio, Prado Museum Guard

Production notes
The film was produced by Hayworth's production company, Hillworth Productions A.G., and distributed by United Artists. The film's executive producer was Hayworth's then-husband, James Hill.

Music
During a test bullfight, a melody based on "Gernikako Arbola can be heard.

See also
 List of American films of 1961

References

External links

1961 films
1960s crime comedy-drama films
1960s heist films
American crime comedy-drama films
American heist films
American black-and-white films
Films produced by James Hill
Films based on American novels
Films directed by George Marshall
Films set in Spain
Films shot in Spain
Films with screenplays by John Gay (screenwriter)
Films scored by Mario Nascimbene
United Artists films
1960s English-language films
1960s American films